Indian Island 28 is a Mi'kmaq First Nation reserve on Indian Island in Canada located in Kent County, New Brunswick.

Its population in the 2016 Census was 138.

Demographics

Population trend

Mother tongue (2016)

History

Notable people

See also
List of communities in New Brunswick
List of Indian reserves in Canada
List of islands of New Brunswick
Indian Island First Nation website

References

Indian reserves in New Brunswick
Communities in Gloucester County, New Brunswick
Mi'kmaq in Canada
Islands of New Brunswick